Wheelton is a civil parish in the Borough of Chorley, Lancashire, England.  It contains twelve buildings that are recorded in the National Heritage List for England as designated listed buildings, all of which are listed at Grade II.  This grade is the lowest of the three gradings given to listed buildings and is applied to "buildings of national importance and special interest".  Apart from the villages of Wheelton and Higher Wheelton, the parish is rural, and many of the listed building are, or originated as, farmhouses and farm buildings.  The Leeds and Liverpool Canal passes through the parish, and associated with this are three listed bridges.  The other listed buildings are two sets of weavers' cottages.

Buildings

References

Citations

Sources

Lists of listed buildings in Lancashire
Buildings and structures in the Borough of Chorley